An independence referendum was held in the French Territory of the Afars and the Issas on 8 May 1977 alongside an election for a Constituent Assembly. Previous referendums were held in 1958 and 1967, which rejected independence. This referendum backed independence from France. The territory became independent as Djibouti on 27 June 1977.

The result is celebrated annually on Independence Day on 27 June.

Results

References

Independence
Independence referendums
Afars and Issas independence referendum
Independence referendum
Afars and Issas independence referendum
Referendums in Djibouti
Afars and Issas